Oulanem is a drama or poetic play written by Karl Marx in 1839 during his years as a student.  The action takes place in a mountain town in Italy.

Characters
 Oulanem – a German traveller
 Lucindo – Oulanem companion
 Pertini – a citizen of a mountain town in Italy
 Alwander – a citizen of the same town
 Beatrice – Alwander's foster-daughter
 Wierin
 Perto – a monk

References

External links
Early Works of Karl Marx: Book of Verse – Scenes from Oulanem: A Tragedy at Marxist Internet Archive.

1839 plays
Books by Karl Marx